Cum Cake is the debut mixtape from American rapper Cupcakke. It was released on February 9, 2016 independently through TuneCore. The first single, "Vagina", was released on October 9, 2015, and achieved viral popularity the same year. "Deepthroat" and "Juicy Coochie" were later-released singles along with "Tit for Tat", "Exceptions", and "Pedophile". The mixtape was listed in Rolling Stones December 2016 40 Best Rap Albums of 2016.

Track listing

References

Cupcakke albums
2016 mixtape albums
Debut mixtape albums
Self-released albums